Gonzo: The Life and Work of Dr. Hunter S. Thompson is a 2008 documentary film directed by Alex Gibney. It details Hunter S. Thompson's landmark writings on music and politics. Friends and family (including Tom Wolfe and Ralph Steadman) provide interviews to help describe the mythos of Hunter and his life.

The film premiered on January 20 in the Documentary Competition at the 2008 Sundance Film Festival, released in theaters in the U.S. on July 4, 2008, and on DVD on November 18, 2008.

Release
The film was released in theaters in the US on July 4, 2008, and in the UK later that year. The DVD was released in November 2008. The film was premiered in January 2008 at the Sundance Film Festival.

Awards
The film was nominated for the Grand Jury prize in the documentary genre at the Sundance Film Festival, and for the Best Documentary Screenplay at the Writers' Guild of America awards in 2009.  In 2009 The Gonzo album notes, co-authored by Johnny Depp and Douglas Brinkley, were nominated for a Grammy award.

Reception
The film received generally positive reviews, The Hollywood Reporter opining that "a biographical documentary doesn't get any better than this."New York magazine called the release "A tender, even-tempered elegy to a writer who at his peak could ingest staggering (literally) amounts of drugs and alcohol and transform, like Popeye after a can of spinach, into a superhuman version of himself-- more trenchant, more cutting, more hilarious than any political journalist before or since."

Variety also praised the film, saying "subject's career being inextricably tied to two extremely entertaining U.S. decades, Gonzo has a wealth of delightful archival footage to draw on, both directly involving Thompson and evoking the cultural landscape around him.", and the film received positive reviews from Entertainment Weekly, The New York Times and the Chicago Sun-Times, amongst others.  Rotten Tomatoes currently lists a 'Certified Fresh' rating with 86% of critics recommending the film.

References

 Gonzo: The Life and Work of Dr. Hunter S. Thompson review on Orange Film

External links
 
 

2008 films
Documentary films about writers
American independent films
Works about Hunter S. Thompson
American documentary films
2008 documentary films
Films directed by Alex Gibney
Films produced by Graydon Carter
Magnolia Pictures films
2000s English-language films
2000s American films